The Mamiya Press is a line of medium-format rangefinder system camera manufactured by Mamiya.  The first model was introduced in 1960, and the final model was discontinued in the 1970s.  It was targeted at the professional press photography market, and a wide array of accessories was offered.  The maximum image size that can be captured is 6 cm × 9 cm, but images can be taken in a number of different formats, and using several types of film.  All of the lenses have leaf shutters, which are released on the lens itself, not through the body as is typical with most cameras.  The shutter is typically triggered from one of several models of removable grips, all of which have a built-in release cable.  The lenses also have flash sync terminals.  The camera lacks an internal dark slide, so one has to be inserted into the film holder before changing the lens.

Models

Mamiya Press
The original Mamiya Press was introduced in 1960 with the M-type back attachment system.  It came with a 90 mm lens and has a bellows mechanism on the back that allows up to 15 degrees of tilt and 31 mm of extension.

Mamiya Press G
The Press G, introduced in 1963, is identical to the original except for the G-type back attachment system, which is compatible with Graflex Speed Graphic cameras.

Mamiya Press S
The Press S is a simplified version of the original camera, introduced in 1964.  It features a fixed 105 mm lens and does not have a rear bellows.

Mamiya 23 Standard
The 23 Standard was a version of the original without the rear bellows introduced in 1965.  The name was changed to reflect the camera's ability to use 2×3 film (with the right film holder).

Mamiya Super 23
Introduced in 1967, the Super 23 was the first major revision in the series.  The body was redesigned, but still retains the rear bellows system.  The much larger viewfinder includes selectable bright lines for the 100 mm, 150 mm, and 250 mm lenses for the first time.  The 100 mm lens became standard. M-Back adapter integrated like in the other earlier versions. Super 23 G-version available.

Mamiya Universal
The final model was introduced in 1969 and lacks the rear bellows.  Instead, Polaroid backs can be mounted directly on the camera, and M-type and G-type backs with the appropriate adapter.

Lenses
 50mm f/6.3 — requires external viewfinder
 65mm f/6.3 — requires external viewfinder
 75mm f/5.6 — requires external viewfinder, image circle covers Polaroid Type 100 and Fuji FP-100C Instant film
 90mm f/3.5
 100mm f/3.5
 100mm f/2.8
 127mm f/4.7 — image circle covers Polaroid Type 100 and Fuji FP-100C Instant film
 150mm f/5.6
 250mm f/8.0 (not rangefinder coupled)
 250mm f/5.0

See also
 List of Mamiya products

References
 6×6 and 6×9 cameras from the Mamiya Historical Museum
 Mamiya Universal camera and accessories
 Mamiya Universal lenses and depth-of-field charts

External links
 Mamiya Press page at Camera-wiki.org
 Comparison of the Mamiya Universal and Polaroid 600SE
 A review of the Mamiya Press and 23 Standard

Press
120 film cameras